This is a list of people from Ballarat. Those included are notable past or present inhabitants originating from, or associated with, the Australian regional city of Ballarat, Victoria.

A

 Reginald Ansett, businessman and founder of Ansett Airways

B

 Henry Bailey, Victorian Minister of Lands and Water Supply 1924-1932; born and educated in Ballarat
 Geoffrey Blainey, former professor at the University of Melbourne; former Chair in Australian Studies at Harvard University
 Sir Henry Bolte, 38th Premier of Victoria
 Ray Borner, Australian Boomers basketball player and four time Olympian
 Steve Bracks, Premier of Victoria
 John Button, Federal Labor politician

C

 Raffaello Carboni, author of an eyewitness account of the uprising at the Eureka Stockade.
 Marie Collier, operatic soprano
 F. W. Commons, monumental mason
 Susan Crennan, former Justice of the High Court of Australia

D
 David Davies, artist
 Henry Daglish, Premier of Western Australia
 Jacqueline Dark, opera singer
 Kimberley Davies, actress
 Bob Davis, Geelong Football Club champion
 Alfred Deakin, inaugural Federal Member of Parliament for Ballarat; second Prime Minister of Australia
 Roger Donaldson, film producer, director, writer
 William Dunstan, Australian recipient of the Victoria Cross
 Will Dyson, illustrator and political cartoonist

E

 Harold Edward Elliott, Major General of the Australian army (educated in Ballarat)
 Warren Ellis, musician, composer, member of Dirty Three, Nick Cave and The Bad Seeds, Grinderman; composed music for movies including The Proposition and The Assassination of Jesse James by the Coward Robert Ford

F

 Frank Fenner, virologist
 David Fleay, naturalist, first breeder of the platypus

G

 Duncan Gillies, Premier of Victoria

H
 Clarice Halligan, nurse, and prisoner of war.
 Edward Hardy, one of Ballarat's foremost mining experts; educated at Mt Egerton State School and worked in mining from 1869; managed many mines; president of the Ballarat Mine Managers' Association 1907-14; died in Ballarat in 1941
 Eileen Healy,  an Australian Sister of Mercy
 Gertrude Healy, Australian violinist, teacher, conductor
 David Hirschfelder, film score composer, performer
 David Hobson, opera singer
 Thomas Hollway, Premier of Victoria
 Craig Revel Horwood, Australian-British dancer, choreographer, and theatre director in the United Kingdom; judge on Strictly Come Dancing
 Bridget Hustwaite (born 1991), radio and television presenter, journalist and Endometriosis Australia ambassador
 Bill Hunter, actor

I
 Bryce Ives, theatre maker, commentator, media producer, former Ballarat Young Person of the Year, Director of the Federation University Arts Academy and Gippsland Centre of Art & Design

J

 William G. James, the ABC's first Director of Music

L

 Peter Lalor, leader of the Eureka Rebellion (1854); colonial Parliamentarian; author of The Story of the Eureka Stockade
 Frank Little, Catholic Archbishop of Melbourne
 Tony Lockett, Australian Football League footballer, Brownlow Medallist and holder of the all-time goalkicking record.
 Ted Lovett, Australian rules footballer
 Arthur Alfred Lynch, (1861-1934), son of John Lynch; engineer and journalist; a Boer Colonel in the Boer War who fought with the Boers (1899-1900); sentenced to death for treason against the British in 1903, pardoned in 1907; elected in House of Commons in absentia by Irish in 1901 and 1909-1918; later became a medical doctor

M

 Robyn Maher, basketball player
 Michael Malthouse, former coach of Collingwood Football Club, Footscray Football Club and West Coast Football Club (AFL Premiership coach in 1992, 1994 and 2010)
 Russell Mark, Olympic shooting gold medallist
 Jamie McDonald, Big Brother housemate and media personality
 Sir Douglas Menzies, Justice of the High Court of Australia
 Sir Robert Menzies, Prime Minister of Australia
 Steve Moneghetti, Olympic marathon runner
 Elsie Morison, opera singer
 Leslie Morshead, General in the Australian Army; Morshead Park is named after him

N

 Hilda Rix Nicholas, painter
 David Noonan, artist. Lives and works in London.
 Benjamin Northey, Chief Conductor of the Christchurch Symphony Orchestra

O

 James Oddie, (1824-1911), Ballarat pioneer, Responsible for the founding of; the Ballarat Fine At gallery and many of the works exhibited within, also principal founder of the Ballarat  botanical gardens, first chairman of the Ballarat Municipal Council in 1856-58.  built and equipped the Mount Pleasant Observatory. erected the Peter Lalor statue at the cost of £2200 in the main street of Ballarat. are amongst  some of his achievements.
 
 Alfred Arthur O'Connor, miner and politician

P

 Michelle Payne, 2015 Melbourne Cup winner
 Cardinal George Pell, Catholic Archbishop Emeritus of Sydney
 Drew Petrie, professional Australian rules footballer

R

 Rosina Raisbeck, opera singer
 Shayne Reese, Olympic swimmer
Gwen Richardson, travel writer
Alfred Ronalds, fly fishing author and artisan
Remi Turkovic, LGBTQ activist and representative of Phoenix Community College

S

 Cyril Staples, cricketer
 Henry Sutton, inventor

T

 Jared Tallent, Olympian race walker
 Luke Tonkin, actor

V

James Valentine, journalist

W

 Hugh D.T. Williamson (1901-1985), banking executive and philanthropist
 Ben Williams, Horticulturalist and Ballarat's foremost expert on the growing and sustaining of crops in the Central Highlands area.

Y
 Ellen Young (1810–1872), poet

See also

List of people from Adelaide
List of people from Brisbane
List of people from Darwin
List of people from Frankston
List of people from Fremantle
List of people from Melbourne
List of people from Rockhampton
List of residents of Sydney
List of people from Toowoomba
List of people from Wagga Wagga
List of people from Wollongong

References

Ballarat
People from Ballarat
Ballarat